Jumbo Machinder is the name of a series of large-scale plastic robots sold by Bandai's character toy subsidiary, Popy in the 1970s. Although a trademarked brand name, in common usage Jumbo Machinder is often applied to any large-size robot toy roto molded out of polyethylene terephthalate (PET), a sturdy plastic also used for shampoo bottles. Jumbo Machinders are generally (but not always) 24" in height. After Popy's success with the Jumbo Machinder series, several other Japanese companies, including Takatoku, Nakajima, and Clover began producing large-size plastic robot toys as well. Several of the Jumbo Machinders were retooled for sale in the USA and Europe in the late 1970s as Shogun Warriors.

Initial Jumbo Machinder line
The first Jumbo Machinder, released in 1973, was a portrayal of manga artist Go Nagai's character Mazinger Z, a fictional Super Robot. Originally planned to stand a meter (roughly three feet) tall, the toy was scaled down out of safety concerns. The Jumbo Machinder Mazinger Z sold approximately 400,000 units in its first five months in stores. The second Jumbo Machinder was Kamen Rider V3, the third Ultraman Taro, the fourth Red Baron, and the fifth Kamen Rider X. The Popy list and approximate year of release:

1973 Mazinger Z
1973 Kamen Rider V3
1973 Ultraman Taro
1973 Super Robot Red Baron
1974 Kamen Rider X
1974 Great Mazinger
1974 Super Robot Mach Baron
1974 Ultraman Leo
1974  Getter Robo 1
1974 Getter Robo 2
1974  Getter Robo 3
1975 UFO Robo Grendizer
1975  Spazer
1975 Getter Dragon
1975 Getter Liger
1975 Getter Poseidon
1975 Brave Raideen
1975 Ganbare!! Robocon
1976 Daikyu-Maru
1977 Danguard Ace
1977  Skyzel
1977 Groundzel
1978 Leopardon
1978 Tosho Daimos
1978 Pimer
1978 Godzilla
1982 Dragon Dol

Jumbo Machinder Deluxe
Over the years, Popy Toy tinkered with the name and characteristics of the Jumbo Machinder series. In the 1976-1977 period, several characters were released under the "Jumbo Machinder Deluxe" name. Aside from the brand name change, the toys are largely identical aesthetically to their predecessors.

Combattler V
Daitetsujin 17
Gaiking
Voltes V

Giant Robot Factory
For the 1979-1980 season, the Jumbo Machinders series was re-designed and re-branded as the Kyodai Robotto Kojo ("Giant Robot Factory"). Unlike their predecessors, the Giant Robot Factory toys were sold disassembled, allowing children to bolt the characters together with a simple tool provided in the package. Aside from the fact that they were sold in a disassembled manner and featured more complicated gimmicks (such as spring-loaded shooting fists), the Giant Robot Factory toys feature a very similar aesthetic to their predecessors and are considered by most collectors to be part of the same series.

Giant Robot Factory branded characters include:
Toshi Gordian
Daltanias
Battle Fever Robo
Daidenjin
Godsigma

Super Jumbo Machinders
Beginning in 1981, Popy Toy changed the name of the series to "Super Jumbo Machinder." Characters released under this brand name include:

Tetsujin 28
Sun Vulcan Robo
Godmars
Golion

Jumbo Machinder NEO
A new line of modern Jumbo Machinders in debuting 2009, gearing towards adult collectors at a fairly high price. While still 22" in height, the figures will no longer be made of polyethylene, but a combination of ABS and vinyl. Only one character is produced so far.

Shin Mazinger Z

Kikaiju (Mechanical Beasts)
The "Kikaiju" (a contraction of "Mechanical" and "Monster") series of toys featured a variety of enemy characters from Mazinger Z and Kamen Rider V3. They were molded out of soft vinyl rather than PET plastic and stand only 20" in height, giving them a very different sort of aesthetic from the Jumbo Machinder toys. A total of ten Kikaiju toys were released in three waves of products. The first wave were simply large-sized soft vinyl figures. The second wave incorporated a simple pinball-style ball launcher feature. The third wave featured more complex gimmicks such as shooting discs, spears, and heads.
Doublas M-2
Garada K-7
King Dan X-10
Gelbros J-3
Spartan K-5

Shogun Warriors
American toy company Mattel acquired the rights to release several Jumbo Machinder toys in North America and Europe under the Shogun Warriors banner. With the exception of "Dragun," the early versions of which were near identical to the original Japanese version, Mattel significantly modified the Jumbo Machinder toys that they released. Several, including Gaiking and Daimos, were completely re-designed from the ground up and differ significantly from their original Japanese counterparts. Jumbo Machinders re-branded as Shogun Warriors include:

Great Mazinger as Mazinga (later as Great Mazinga)
 Mazinger Z as Mazinga-Z (the figure was a hybrid using parts from Great Mazinger and Grendizer and was only released in Europe.)
Gaiking
Getter Robo G's Getter Dragon as Dragun
Daimos
Raideen as Raydeen
Grendizer (only released in Europe and Canada; sold as Goldorak in France and Quebec and Goldrake in Italy)
 Astro Robot Terremoto Stellare (Only released in Italy and mostly made from parts of Raideen, Gaiking and Grendizer)
 Astro Robot Sfondamento Galattico (Only released in Italy and mostly made from parts of Raideen, Gaiking and Grendizer)
 Astro Robot Turbine Solare (Only released in Italy and mostly made from parts of Raideen, Gaiking and Grendizer)
 Astro Robot Tempesta Spaziale (Only released in Italy and mostly made from parts of Raideen, Gaiking and Grendizer)
Godzilla 
Rodan (made exclusively for the US market)

In 2010, Toynami revived the Shogun Warriors name with a new toy line, which consists of 24-inch (550 mm) Jumbo Machinder toys. The first two robots in this line are GoLion and Dairugger XV (both of which were adapted in the Western world as Voltron). Since then figures based on Bender and Godzilla 64' have been made sporadically.

See also
 Mazinger Toy Lines

References

External links
 ToyboxDX - A description of Popy Toy and photos of the Jumbo Machinder Mazinger Z
 Super #1 Robot - A book featuring photographs of Jumbo Machinders
 CollectionDX - Jumbo Machinder Listings and reviews.
 Jumboland - Jumbo Machinder reference.
 ShogunWarriors.org - Jumbo Machinder reference

Action figures
Japanese die-cast toys
1970s toys
Toy robots
Bandai